Michael Edward Campbell Champion (born November 3, 1946 in Anderson, Indiana – died June 16, 2021) was an American singer, songwriter and musician who started his public career in Detroit.  In 1967, with a short-lived band called 'The Abstract Reality', he released a 45 rpm single called Love Burns Like A Fire Inside.<ref
 name=SportRecords104> (Note: side B: ib. instrumental version)</ref> With Bob 'Babbitt' Kreinar, Ray Monette and Andrew Smith he formed Scorpion. His name appears as Mike Campbell on the album Scorpion and Meat Loaf's debut album Stoney & Meatloaf (1971). For this recording, apart from having co-written four songs, he played the harmonica on Lady Be Mine.<ref
 name=Scorpion></ref>

He became an actor by the name of Michael Champion and since 1979 played in several TV series and films such as Diagnosis Murder (1993), Matlock (1989), and The Flash (1991, as Captain Cold),  History of the World: Part I (1981), Beverly Hills Cop (1984), Total Recall (1990) and Toy Soldiers (1991), and video game characters like the terrorist in Flash Traffic: City of Angels (1994) and 'Wolf' in Maximum Surge (1996).
Musician and record co-producer Ralph Terrana has been quoted: "He [Campbell] was a very talented writer. He also could be a little unusual. We called him Crazy Mike."

Filmography

References

External links
 

1946 births
2021 deaths
People from Anderson, Indiana
American male singer-songwriters
American male television actors
American male video game actors
American male film actors
Singer-songwriters from Indiana